Chircăieștii Noi is a commune in Căușeni District, Moldova. It is composed of two villages, Baurci and Chircăieștii Noi.

References

Communes of Căușeni District